Zavodske is a name of several localities in Ukraine:

 Zavodske, Poltava Oblast, a city in Poltava Oblast formerly known as Chervonozavodske
 Zavodske, Ternopil Oblast, an urban-type settlement in Ternopil Oblast